Lesbian, gay, bisexual, and transgender (LGBT) persons in the U.S. state of Pennsylvania enjoy most of the same rights as non-LGBT residents. Same-sex sexual activity is legal in Pennsylvania. Same-sex couples and families headed by same-sex couples are eligible for all of the protections available to opposite-sex married couples. Pennsylvania was the final Mid-Atlantic state without same-sex marriage, indeed lacking any form of same-sex recognition law until its statutory ban was overturned on May 20, 2014.

Discrimination on the basis of sexual orientation and gender identity is not explicitly banned in the state, though some cities and counties ban such discrimination, including Philadelphia, Pittsburgh, Allentown, Erie and Reading (the five most populous cities in the state). Some cities and counties within Pennsylvania also ban conversion therapy on minors. In August 2018, the Pennsylvania Human Relations Commission interpreted existing state law covering sex discrimination as including the categories of sexual orientation and gender identity, effectively banning discrimination against LGBT people in employment, housing, education, and public accommodation.

On June 15, 2020, in Bostock v. Clayton County, Georgia, the U.S. Supreme Court ruled that discrimination in the workplace on the basis of sexual orientation or gender identity is discrimination on the basis of sex, and Title VII therefore protects LGBT employees from workplace discrimination.

Both Philadelphia and Pittsburgh have vibrant LGBT communities, with pride parades having been held since the 1970s and attracting more than 100,000 attendees as of 2017.

Legality of same-sex sexual activity
Pennsylvania has repealed its sodomy statutes incrementally. In 1972, legislation legalized consensual sodomy for heterosexual married couples. In 1980, the Supreme Court of Pennsylvania ruling in Commonwealth v. Bonadio found Pennsylvania's sodomy law unconstitutional as violating the equal protection guarantees of both the state and federal constitutions. Pennsylvania repealed its remaining sodomy laws in 1995. In December 2021, an 81 year old gay man within Pennsylvania went to jail due to an “archaic sexual deviant law without trial” for nearly 2 years because he had oral sex within a nursing home, which staff alleged was non-consensual.

Obscenity statute
In March 2021, the small township of Upper Darby discovered a 1987 anti-obscenity ordinance which defined "sexual conduct" as including "acts of masturbation, homosexuality, sexual intercourse, sexual bestiality" and other sexual conduct. Arguing that a law against the public display of "acts of homosexuality" to minors could be read broadly to make even a Pride Parade "obscene" under the ordinance, local activist Damien Christopher Warsavage led the charge to have the ordinance repealed in its entirety, which succeeded. During this process, the town discovered that this ordinance paralleled a state obscenity law (18 PA 5903
), which led to two votes in May 2021 at the Pennsylvania General Assembly to remove "acts of homosexuality" from the statute. Both votes failed. In July 2022, the Pennsylvania General Assembly passed a bill unanimously in both houses to repeal the archaic two word references "homosexuality" - within the criminal code of Pennsylvania (listed under obscenity). The Governor of Pennsylvania Tom Wolf signed the bill into law and went into effect immediately in the same month.

Recognition of same-sex relationships

Same-sex marriage was legalized in Pennsylvania on May 20, 2014, when U.S. District Court Judge John E. Jones III ruled in Whitewood v. Wolf that the state's statutory ban on such marriages was unconstitutional. After the ACLU filed the lawsuit in federal court on July 9, 2013, Attorney General Kathleen Kane said she would refuse to defend the statute.

Previously, Pennsylvania did not recognize same-sex marriages, civil unions, or domestic partnerships. Attempts had been made in recent years to allow for such unions. There had also been attempts to amend the State Constitution to prohibit same-sex marriage.

Local domestic partnerships
While domestic partnerships were never offered statewide, the city of Philadelphia offers 'life partnerships' in the case of a "long-term committed relationship between two unmarried individuals of the same gender who are residents of the city; or one of whom is employed in the city, owns real property in the city, owns and operates a business in the city, or is a recipient of or has a vested interest in employee benefits from the City of Philadelphia." The city of Pittsburgh also provides domestic partnerships. County employees in Luzerne County are required to identify if they are in a domestic partnership, which is explicitly defined as being between people of the same gender.

Adoption and parenting
Pennsylvania allows a single person to adopt without respect to sexual orientation.

Until 2002, Pennsylvania did not permit stepchild adoption by a person of the same sex as the first parent. A 6-0 ruling by the Supreme Court of Pennsylvania established the right of same-sex couples to stepchild adoptions. No statute prohibits a same-sex couple from adopting a child jointly.

Hate crime law
Pennsylvania passed a hate crime law in 2002 that covered LGBT people, but the Pennsylvania Supreme Court struck it down in 2008 on a technicality: legislators inserted the language into an unrelated bill on agricultural terrorism, changing that bill's purpose during the legislative process, which violates the Pennsylvania Constitution. Legislation was introduced in several sessions to reinstate the law, but it never made it out of committee.

In April 2021, the Mayor of Pittsburgh Bill Peduto that quoted “he would sign a city-wide hate crime ordinance - to explicitly include sexual orientation, gender identity and disability, that goes much further than that of state law”.

Discrimination protections

There are statewide executive orders protecting LGBT individuals from workplace discrimination. In 1975, Pennsylvania became the first U.S. state in which an executive order was issued providing for discrimination protection on the basis of sexual orientation in state employment. In 2003, gender identity was added to this executive order and the order has been reissued by every governor since then. On April 7, 2016, Governor Tom Wolf signed two executive orders, the first order prohibiting discrimination against state employees based on their sexual orientation, gender identity, HIV status and other factors and the second mandate banning state contractors from discriminating against their LGBT employees.

For more than ten years, legislation that would protect LGBT people statewide from discrimination based on sexual orientation or gender identity has awaited action in the Pennsylvania General Assembly. On December 17, 2013, Governor Tom Corbett announced his support for such legislation with respect to sexual orientation after learning that federal law did not already provide such protection as he had previously thought. He said he anticipated bipartisan support for the legislation.

Many Pennsylvania municipalities and counties, including the five most populous cities, have enacted ordinances implementing such discrimination protections.

Since August 2018, discrimination based on both sexual orientation and gender identity has been interpreted by the Pennsylvania Human Relations Commission as being banned under the category of sex of the Pennsylvania Human Relations Act. LGBT people who have been discriminated against in employment, housing, education, and public accommodations can now file complaints with the Commission, which will investigate each complaint and can advise those responsible to stop a discriminatory practice, implement training, or award economic damages. Pennsylvania was the second state to achieve statewide LGBT protections this way, following Michigan in May 2018. In December 2022, with implemented legally-binding regulations added and signed off by the Governor Tom Wolf (during his last executive direction decision) - under the "definition of sex", also explicitly includes sexual orientation and gender identity.

In May 2020, Pennsylvania became the only US jurisdiction to include both sexual orientation and gender identity in COVID-19 statistics and data collection.

2020 ban on cannabis and LGBT pride flags 
During the 2020 Pennsylvania General Assembly session, a Omnibus Budget Appropriations Bill that passed and was signed into law by Pennsylvania Governor Tom Wolf, it contained a ban on both cannabis and LGBT pride flags from flying at the Pennsylvania General Assembly that was "secretly added in" - it was not known or printed until right after the bill was signed into law.

Gender identity and expression
Sex reassignment surgery is legal in the state.

In August 2016, the Pennsylvania Department of Health changed requirements for transgender people to change their gender on their birth certificates. Sex reassignment surgery is no longer a requirement. Instead, transgender persons will just have to present a note from a physician stating that they have had appropriate clinical treatment for gender transition. Additionally, children under 18 who wish to change their gender on their birth certificate will need their parents to make the request.

Since July 1, 2020, Pennsylvania has a third gender option (known as "X") available on driver's licenses and state IDs - however not on individuals birth certificates.

In November 2019 three legal ordinances related to gender identity were signed into law by the Mayor of Philadelphia, Jim Kenney. These laws prohibit youth-serving organizations from discriminating against trans, nonbinary, and gender-nonconforming youth; require every city-owned building to have at least one gender-neutral bathroom; and clarify that the city's Fair Practice Ordinance protects nonbinary and gender-fluid people against discrimination. These laws only apply within the City of Philadelphia. In December 2021, all virtual public schools within the City of Philadelphia will include a selected legal non-binary gender X option alongside male and female.

In June 2022, a bill to ban transgender individuals from playing sports, athletics and Olympics on female teams passed both houses of the Pennsylvania General Assembly. Several US states have already legally implemented similar legislation. The Governor of Pennsylvania Tom Wolf vetoed the bill the next month in July 2022.

Conversion therapy

A bill to ban the use of conversion therapy on LGBT minors in Pennsylvania was introduced in the General Assembly in April 2015. The bill had 20 sponsors, all of whom were Democrats, but it died without any legislative action.

On December 14, 2016, Pittsburgh became the first city in Pennsylvania to pass an ordinance that bans conversion therapy on minors. The ban was passed 9-0 and took effect on January 1, 2017. Philadelphia and Allentown followed suit in July 2017. Reading and Doylestown both enacted conversion therapy bans in December 2017.

State College passed a ban in February 2018, and Yardley did so the following month. Both Bellefonte and Bethlehem followed suit in July 2018.

Newtown Township, in Bucks County, unanimously voted to ban conversion therapy in November 2018.

Executive order
In August 2022, the Governor of Pennsylvania Tom Wolf signed an executive order effective immediately - to legally ban any state-based government funding going towards conversion therapy for individuals within Pennsylvania. About 50% of the jurisdictions/states within the United States of America has already implemented explicit bans on conversion therapy - with either by legislation or executive order.

Public opinion
A 2017 Public Religion Research Institute (PRRI) poll found that 64% of Pennsylvania residents supported same-sex marriage, while 27% were opposed. 9% were undecided. Additionally, 69% supported an anti-discrimination law covering sexual orientation and gender identity. 23% were against. The PRRI also found that 62% were against allowing public businesses to refuse to serve LGBT people due to religious beliefs, while 30% supported such religiously-based refusals.

Summary table

See also
 Law of Pennsylvania
 Equality Pennsylvania
 LGBT rights in the United States

References

LGBT rights in Pennsylvania